is a railway station in the city of Fuji, Shizuoka Prefecture, Japan, operated by the private railway operator Gakunan Railway.

Lines

Station layout
Gakunan-Harada Station has one island platform connected to the station building by a level crossing. It is staffed only during the morning commuting hours. In addition, adjacent multiple tracks used for container freight services as well as private freight services to the nearby Nippon Daishowa Paperboard Company factories parallel the passenger tracks.

Adjacent stations

Station history
Gakunan-Harada Station was opened on December 20, 1951.

Passenger statistics
In fiscal 2017, the station was used by an average of 263 passengers daily (boarding passengers only).

Surrounding area
 Harada Elementary School

See also
 List of Railway Stations in Japan

References

External links

  

Railway stations in Shizuoka Prefecture
Railway stations in Japan opened in 1951
Fuji, Shizuoka